The following article is a summary of the 2017 football season in Kenya, which is the 53rd competitive season in its history.

Domestic leagues

Promotion and relegation

Relegated from Premier League
 Nairobi City Stars
 Ushuru

Promoted to Premier League
 Kariobangi Sharks
 Nakumatt
 Nzoia Sugar (formerly Nzoia United)
 Zoo Kericho

Premier League

The 2017 Kenyan Premier League season began on 11 March and is scheduled to end on 18 November.

International club competitions

Champions League

The 2017 CAF Champions League began on 10 February and is scheduled to end on 5 November. Tusker represented Kenya in the competition, having won the 2016 Kenyan Premier League.

Preliminary round
In the preliminary round, Tusker faced 2015–16 Mauritian League winners AS Port-Louis 2000 over two legs, played on 11 and 19 February. They were eliminated after losing 3–2 on aggregate.

Confederation Cup

The 2017 CAF Confederation Cup began on 10 February and is scheduled to end on 26 November. Ulinzi Stars represented Kenya in the competition, having lost the 2016 FKF President's Cup final to league champions Tusker.

Preliminary round
In the preliminary round, Ulinzi Stars faced 2016 Libyan Cup runners-up Al-Hilal Benghazi over two legs, played on 10 and 18 February. They advanced to the first round after winning 5–4 on penalties, having drawn 1–1 on aggregate.

First round
In the first round, Ulinzi Stars faced 2015–16 Egyptian Premier League second runners-up Smouha over two legs, played on 10 and 18 March. They were eliminated after losing 4–3 on aggregate.

National teams

Men's senior

Africa Cup of Nations qualification

The men's senior national team is participating in qualification for the 2019 Africa Cup of Nations. They were drawn in Group F alongside Ghana, Ethiopia and Sierra Leone.

Other matches
The following is a list of all other matches (to be) played by the men's senior national team in 2017.

Women's senior

COSAFA Women's Championship
The women's senior national team was invited to participate in the 2017 COSAFA Women's Championship, which took place in Zimbabwe from 13 to 24 September 2017.

Group stage
Kenya was drawn in Group B alongside Mauritius, Mozambique and Swaziland. They advanced to the knockout stage after finishing top of the group with 9 points from 3 games.

Knockout stage
Kenya finished the knockout stage in fourth place after losing their semi-final to Zimbabwe and the bronze medal match to Zambia on penalties.

Notes

References